Springer is a town in Carter County, Oklahoma, United States. The population was 700 at the 2010 census. It is part of the Ardmore, Oklahoma Micropolitan Statistical Area.

History 
A post office was established at Springer, Indian Territory on September 1, 1890.  It was named for W.A. Springer, a pioneer rancher and cattleman.

At the time of its founding, Springer was located in Pickens County, Chickasaw Nation.

Geography
Springer is located northeast of the center of Carter County at  (34.304569, -97.136499). U.S. Route 77 passes through the center of town, and Interstate 35 runs along the western edge, with access from Exits 40 (Brooks Road) and 42 (State Highway 53).

The town is located just south of the Arbuckle Mountains, a small range of hills.

Demographics

As of the census of 2000, there were 577 people, 237 households, and 181 families residing in the town. There were 267 housing units at an average density of 18.5 per square mile (7.1/km2). The racial makeup of the town was 84.92% White, 2.60% African American, 7.11% Native American, 1.39% from other races, and 3.99% from two or more races. Hispanic or Latino of any race were 4.01% of the population.

There were 237 households, out of which 26.6% had children under the age of 18 living with them, 66.2% were married couples living together, 7.6% had a female householder with no husband present, and 23.6% were non-families. 21.9% of all households were made up of individuals, and 13.5% had someone living alone who was 65 years of age or older. The average household size was 2.43 and the average family size was 2.83.

In the town, the population was spread out, with 23.6% under the age of 18, 7.3% from 18 to 24, 24.6% from 25 to 44, 28.9% from 45 to 64, and 15.6% who were 65 years of age or older. The median age was 40 years. For every 100 females, there were 94.3 males. For every 100 females age 18 and over, there were 90.9 males.

The median income for a household in the town was $32,000, and the median income for a family was $35,375. Males had a median income of $35,500 versus $18,864 for females. The per capita income for the town was $15,640. About 7.0% of families and 7.9% of the population were below the poverty line, including 13.2% of those under age 18 and 9.9% of those age 65 or over.

References

Towns in Carter County, Oklahoma
Towns in Oklahoma
Ardmore, Oklahoma micropolitan area